AD Universidad de Oviedo is the women's basketball team of the University of Oviedo. Is based in Oviedo and plays in Liga Femenina 2. The men's team (1971-2012) was based in Mieres.

In other time, the team was known as Club Atlético Universitario (CAU).

Season by season

References and notes

External links
Profile at Asturcesto 
Men's basketball team on FEB.es 

Sport in Oviedo
University of Oviedo
Basketball teams in Asturias
Women's basketball teams in Spain
Basketball teams established in 1982
1982 establishments in Spain